Borovo Naselje is a Vukovar borough located on the right bank of the Danube river in the Croatian region of Slavonia, 4 kilometers northwest of Vukovar town centre; elevation 90 m.  The economy is based on rubber and shoe industries. The routes D2, D55 and D519 intersect in Borovo Naselje, connecting Vukovar to Osijek, Vinkovci and Dalj, respectively. The suburb originally developed as a part of Borovo village and its cadastral community but was subsequently separated and incorporated as a part of the town of Vukovar in 1980's.

History
Borovo Naselje sprung up around the Borovo rubber products factory, built and owned by Tomáš Baťa before World War II. The entire town was built around the factory to provide housing and other necessary institutions for the employees. The town grew and finally merged with the neighboring town of Vukovar. After Borovo Naselje merged with Vukovar, it shed its name and became a part of Vukovar, but it's still known as Borovo Naselje among the locals.

Borovo was established on the outskirts of Vukovar by a Czech businessman Tomaš Bata on 7 June 1931 to begin with the manufacture of footwear.

Sport 
 HNK Borovo

See also
 Borovo Municipality (different from Borovo Naselje)
 Vukovar–Borovo Naselje railway station

References

Sources 
 https://web.archive.org/web/20061212155050/http://www.borovo.hr/edanas.htm

External links

Blog about history of Borovo Naselje
Vukovar Official site
Vukovarac -  Vukovar Unofficial site
Borovo factory
HNK Radnicki Borovo N. - Vukovar
HNK Borovo - Unofficial

Populated places in Vukovar-Syrmia County
Populated places on the Danube
Populated places in Syrmia